Spadolini may refer to:

 Giovanni Spadolini (1925–1994), Italian journalist, 44th Prime Minister of Italy, one-month Acting President of Italy upon the resignation of President Cossiga in 1992
 Spadolini I Cabinet, in office from 28 June 1981 to 23 August 1982
 Spadolini II Cabinet, in office  from 23 August 1982 to 1 December 1982
 15381 Spadolini, a minor planet discovered by V. Goretti in 1997